Abbas Hajari was an Iranian communist and military officer.

He was member of the Tudeh Military Network that was uncovered in 1954, as a result he spent 25 years in prison until 1978. After the Iranian Revolution, he ran for an Assembly of Experts for Constitution seat from Tehran constituency. He was Secretariat-in-charge of Tehran provincial committee.

In 1983, he was arrested by the Islamic Republic government and was put on trial. Reynaldo Galindo Pohl, United Nations Special Rapporteur on Human Rights in Iran, cites his name among the victims of 1988 executions of Iranian political prisoners.

References 

1922 births
1988 deaths
20th-century executions by Iran
Tudeh Military Network members
People from Mashhad
Iranian prisoners and detainees
Imperial Iranian Army personnel
Iranian people convicted of spying for the Soviet Union
Tudeh Party of Iran politicians
Executed communists